Artur Arturovych Murza (born 13 July 2000) is a Ukrainian professional footballer who plays as a left midfielder for Latvian club Valmiera.

Career

Valmiera
On 17 July 2022, he moved to Valmiera in the Latvian Higher League.

Honours
Valmiera
 Latvian Higher League: 2022

References

External links
 
 

2000 births
Living people
People from Volnovakha
Ukrainian footballers
Association football midfielders
FC Mariupol players
FC Volyn Lutsk players
FC Kramatorsk players
FC Hirnyk-Sport Horishni Plavni players
FC Obolon-Brovar Kyiv players
FC Metalist Kharkiv players
FC Kyzylzhar players
Valmieras FK players
Ukrainian Premier League players
Ukrainian First League players
Kazakhstan Premier League players
Sportspeople from Donetsk Oblast
Ukrainian expatriate footballers
Expatriate footballers in Kazakhstan
Ukrainian expatriate sportspeople in Kazakhstan
Expatriate footballers in Latvia
Ukrainian expatriate sportspeople in Latvia